The Ministry of Finance Complex is a building complex housing the Malaysian Ministry of Finance, opposite the Boulevard and Dataran Wawasan in Precinct 2 (north of the Core island) of Putrajaya.

The Ministry of Finance (MoF) comprises the Royal Customs and Excise Department, Department of Valuation and Property Services, Department of the National Accountant of Malaysia, Inland Revenue Board, Securities Commission, and National Bank of Malaysia.

See also
 Ministry of Finance (Malaysia)

Buildings and structures in Putrajaya
Ministry of Finance (Malaysia)